Thames River Multi Hedge PCC is a large British hedge fund. Established in 2004, the company is a former constituent of the FTSE 250 Index. The Chairman is William Backhouse.

References

External links
  Official site

Hedge funds